Waspam is a Miskito town and a municipality in the North Caribbean Coast Autonomous Region of Nicaragua.

Language 
Waspam is one of the main Miskito towns, 90 percent of the population is Miskito, the regional official language is Miskito, but English, Mayangna and Spanish are also spoken in region.

Culture 
The dominant culture is Miskito, followed by Mayangna and a very few Latinos.

Miskito pine forest 
A huge area of Miskito pine forest is found in Waspam.

Rivers 
Waspam has more rivers then any other region of Central America and more them are non polluted. Wangki is the longest river of Central America and it's located in Waspam.

References 

Municipalities of the North Caribbean Coast Autonomous Region
Honduras–Nicaragua border crossings